Romántico y Sabroso ("Romantic and Delicious") is the title of the 1988 studio album released by Puerto Rican salsa group, El Gran Combo de Puerto Rico. The album is considered El Gran Combo's first release dominated by the distinct subgenre known as salsa romantica. Also was the last album were Edgardo Morales played the Drums.

Singles
Three singles produced from the album charted on the Billboard Hot Latin Tracks.

Cupido ("Cupid") was the first single released from the album and reached the top ten on Hot Latin  Tracks peaking on #8.
Potro Amarrao was the second single released from the album and reached #28 on the Hot Latin  Tracks.
Quince Años was the third single released from the album and reached #26 on the Hot Latin Tracks.

Track listing

Critical reception

José A. Estévez, Jr. of Allmusic gave the album a positive review and noted the change of style within the group with the influence of the salsa romantica era. Romántico y Sabroso was nominated for a Lo Nuestro Award for Tropical Album of the Year in 1989.

Chart performance

References

1988 albums
El Gran Combo de Puerto Rico albums
Spanish-language albums